The Alpine Club of Pakistan (ACP) is a non governmental sports organisation for the promotion of mountaineering, climbing and other mountain-related adventure activities in Pakistan. In addition to this, the club serves as the national sports governing body for the sport of mountaineering and climbing in Pakistan.

History
The club was founded in 1974, and has its head office at the Jinnah Sports Stadium in Islamabad. Since 1977, the Club has trained a large number of its members, armed forces personnel, locals, liaisons and ladies in rock and ice climbing, mountaineering, and other mountain tourism related activities at its training institute at Nilt in Gilgit Baltistan.

Affiliations
The club is affiliated with:
 International Mountaineering and Climbing Federation
 International Federation of Sport Climbing
 Union of Asian Alpine Associations
 Pakistan Sports Board

Presidents

Secretaries

References

External links
 Official Website

Sports governing bodies in Pakistan
Mountaineering in Pakistan
Climbing organizations
Alpine clubs
1974 establishments in Pakistan
Sports organizations established in 1974